Frederick Stokes may refer to:

Frederick Stokes (rugby union) (1850–1929), first captain of the England national rugby union team
Sir Frederick Wilfred Scott Stokes (1860–1927), inventor and civil engineer
 Frederick A. Stokes (1857–1939), American publisher

See also

 Fred Stokes (born 1964), U.S. American football player